The 2006 Oakville municipal elections took place on 13 November 2006, to elect a Regional Government chair, the Town mayor, six Town and Regional Councillors, and six Town Councillors in Oakville, Ontario, Canada.

Oakville elects two councillors from each of six wards to its Town Council for a total of 13, including the Mayor. Each ward elects one of its two councillors to serve also on the 21 member Council of the Regional Government of the Municipality of Halton. The Mayor of Oakville is a voting member of both Councils. The other members of the Halton Council come from Burlington (7), Milton (3) and Halton Hills (3), plus the directly elected at large Chair of the Region.

In addition, school trustees were elected to the Halton District Public School Board, Halton District Catholic School Board, Conseil scolaire de district du Centre-Sud-Ouest and Conseil scolaire de district catholique Centre-Sud. These elections ran in conjunction with those in all other municipalities across the province of Ontario (see 2006 Ontario municipal elections).

Town Mayor and Town Council Member (1 of 13) & Regional Councillor (1 of 21) 

Town (6 of 13) and Regional Councils (6 of 21)

Town Council (6 of 13)

See also
2003 Oakville municipal election

References
Elections Oakville - Official Results

Municipal government of Oakville, Ontario
2006 Ontario municipal elections